Huntington Township is one of the sixteen townships of Brown County, Ohio, United States. The 2010 census found 2,763 people in the township, 1,125 of whom lived in the unincorporated portions of the township.

Geography
Located in the southeastern corner of the county along the Ohio River, it borders the following townships:
Byrd Township - north
Liberty Township, Adams County - northeast
Sprigg Township, Adams County - east
Union Township - northwest
Mason County, Kentucky lies across the Ohio River to the southwest.

It is the most southerly township in Brown County.

The village of Aberdeen is located in southwestern Huntington Township, along the Ohio River.

Name and history
Huntington Township is named for Samuel Huntington, signer of the Declaration of Independence.

Statewide, other Huntington Townships are located in Gallia, Lorain, and Ross counties.

Government
The township is governed by a three-member board of trustees, who are elected in November of odd-numbered years to a four-year term beginning on the following January 1. Two are elected in the year after the presidential election and one is elected in the year before it. There is also an elected township fiscal officer, who serves a four-year term beginning on April 1 of the year after the election, which is held in November of the year before the presidential election. Vacancies in the fiscal officership or on the board of trustees are filled by the remaining trustees.

References

External links
County website

Townships in Brown County, Ohio
Townships in Ohio